The Mogods are Mountain ranges of Northern Tunisia, culminating at 500 meters height. They constitute the limit of the region of Khroumire.

Location
The Mogods are situated between the seaside at north and the Medjerda River valley at the South, at the extremity of the Atlas Mountains.

References

Mountain ranges of Tunisia